Tenterden is a town located 328 km south-east of Perth in the Shire of Cranbrook in the Great Southern region of Western Australia. The townsite is located on one of the sidings on the Great Southern Railway line. The siding was established in 1891 and shortly afterward the government made land available for agricultural purposes in the area. The town was gazetted in 1893 and is named after a town in Kent.

2003 Fire
On 27 December 2003, two live power lines clashed and shorted out resulting in a large bushfire. Two local women died in the fire. Crop, property and stock damage was estimated to be in the millions of dollars. In December 2005, Western Power was fined $17,500 by a magistrate, having been taken to court by the Office of Energy Safety for failing to maintain a safe power network.

References 

Towns in Western Australia
Shire of Cranbrook